Walter Charles Guralnick, DMD (November 1916 – September 6, 2017) was a Boston-based dentist who helped launch dental insurance in Massachusetts.  He was Professor of Oral and Maxillofacial Surgery, Emeritus, at Massachusetts General Hospital and Dean of the Harvard School of Dental Medicine.  He lived in Chestnut Hill, Massachusetts.  His wife of 68 years, Betty Marson Guralnick, died in 2010 at age 89.

Guralnick worked for 65 years at the Massachusetts General Hospital in Boston.

Education
Graduated from Boston Latin School and went to Massachusetts State College, which later became the University of Massachusetts Amherst
Harvard School of Dental Medicine in 1941

References 

1916 births
2017 deaths
American centenarians
Men centenarians
American dentists
Harvard School of Dental Medicine alumni
Boston Latin School alumni
University of Massachusetts Amherst alumni
Members of the National Academy of Medicine
Massachusetts General Hospital faculty
Health insurance in the United States
Dental academics
American health activists
20th-century dentists